Region
Madiina is a suburb located in south Mogadishu, Somalia. It is a part of the Dharkanley district of Banadir region.

Mogadishu
Banaadir